The Hofstra Physical Fitness Center is a 2,500-seat multi-purpose arena in the town of Hempstead, in the U.S. state of New York.  It opened in 1970.  It was home to the Hofstra University Pride basketball team until the Hofstra Arena opened in 1999.

External links
Venue information

Indoor arenas in New York (state)
Defunct college basketball venues in the United States
College volleyball venues in the United States
Sports venues in Long Island
Basketball venues in New York (state)
Physical
Sports venues in Hempstead, New York
Sports venues in Nassau County, New York
Volleyball venues in New York (state)
1970 establishments in New York (state)
Sports venues completed in 1970